Philippe Derome (born 18 February 1937 in Paris) is a French figurative painter.

Biography 
Philippe Derome grew up in Boulogne-Billancourt and in Villeurbanne. In 1956 he settled in Paris where he studied for two years with Paul Colin. From 1960 to 1970 he was privileged enough to be part of the sophisticated and artistic circles of Paris. In Paris, he met black American students and writers such as James Baldwin.  Baldwin fed his interest on issues related to black American identity.  Later in the 1980s he also painted themes about the black people in France. The staggered representation of recreation is another dominant theme seen in Derome's work.

Themes 
His main subjects are :

The leisure civilisation : Ski, beaches scenes, nights clubs
Négritude, Civil Rights Movement, Selma to Montgomery marches and later black people in France.
Vanitas
War

Techniques 

Oils and acrylics on canvas, gouaches on paper.
Objects and painted furnitures.
Collages : books of photograpics assemblies or colors papers silhouette cut and stuck as artwork

Artworks
Still Life with Mackerel and Red Mullet (1954)
Riot (1963)
Selma marche (1968)
Black head (1971)
Le Flore'(1973)Jusqu'à quand ? (1974)Skieurs (1976)Harmony (1987)Tank rouge (1994)AIDS, hotel Bailey, NY'' (1997)

Shows 

1959 : Galerie Luc Burnap. Saint-Tropez. France
1960 : Luc Burnap Gallery. New York. USA
1967 : Biennale du Grand Palais, Paris (« Ph. Derome peint une conversation au Flore à la manière de Jean-Luc Godart », J. Warnod,  le Figaro
1968 : Salon de Mai «A very hard-working young painter who knows what he wants and worries very little about –isms and the théories and ideas of others. »  Edouard Roditi, NY Diplomat
1973 - 1980 : Galerie Annick Gendron Paris
1974 : Collection Jean Pierre Brasseur-Gregor. Munich (with a documentary realized by Fassbinder)
1978 : Marbella Club. Marbella

Notes and references

External links 
 Philippe Derome : Black paints
 Philippe Derome : Paintings

1937 births
Living people
Painters from Paris
20th-century French painters
20th-century French male artists
French male painters
21st-century French painters
21st-century French male artists